The List of awards and nominations received by  refers to the awards and nominations which were received by Albanian singer and songwriter Alban Skënderaj.

Festivali i Këngës 
 

|-
||2010
||Ende Ka Shpresë (ft. Miriam Cani)"
|Second Prize
|
|}

Kënga Magjike 

|-
|rowspan="2"|2012
|rowspan="2"|"Refuzoje"
|First Prize
|
|-
|Public Prize
|
|}

Kult Awards 

|-
||2009
||"Melodi"
|Best Album of the Year
|
|}

Netet e Klipit Shqiptar 

|-
||2008
||"Larg dhe Afër"
|Best Video/First Prize
|
|-
||2013
||"Më prit atje"
|Best Story in Video
|
|-
||2016
||"Kam Nevoje (ft.Elinel)"
|Best collaboration
|
|}

Top Fest 

|-
|rowspan="2"|2005
|rowspan="2"|"Vetem ty"
|First Prize
|
|-
|Internet Prize
|
|-
||2006
||"Dicka (feat Kthjellu)"
|First Prize
|
|}

Top Music Awards

|-
|rowspan="2"|2016
|rowspan="2"|"Alban Skenderaj"
|Male Artist of the Year
|
|-
|Achievement Award
|
|-
|rowspan="2"|2016
|rowspan="2"|"Une edhe ti"
|Tar Hit of the Year 
|
|-
|Song of the Year
|
|}

Video Fest Awards 

|-
||2006
||"Dicka (feat Kthjellu)"
|Best Rock
|
|-
||2007
||"Ky ritem"
|Best Male
|
|-
||2008
||"Eklips"
|Best Male
|
|-
|rowspan="4"|2009
|rowspan="4"|"Larg dhe afër"
|Best Video/First Prize
|
|-
|Best Camera
|
|-
|Best Performance
|
|-
|Best Rock
|
|-
|rowspan="2"|2010
|rowspan="2"|"This Is Your Day"
|Best Male
|
|-
|Best Camera
|
|-
||2010
||"Let Me Die With You (ft. (ft. Miriam Cani))
|Public Prize
|
|-
|rowspan="3"|2012
|rowspan="3"|"Mirë se vjen në shpirtin tim"
|Best Video / First Prize
|
|-
|Best Pop
|
|-
|Best Director
|
|-
|rowspan="2"|2013
|rowspan="2"|"Mirëmëngjes"
|Best Pop
|
|-
|Best Male
|
|-
||2014
||"Mrekullia e tetë "
|Best Pop
|
|}

Zhurma Show Awards 

|-
||2009
||"Mesnate"
|Best Rock Album
|
|-
||2009
||"Let me die with you"
|Best Rock Collaboration
|
|-
||2010
||"Si më parë"
|Best Rock
|
|-
|rowspan="2"|2012
|rowspan="2"|"Mirmëngjes"
|Best Video / First Prize
|
|-
|Best Rock
|
|-
||2013
||"Nëse thua PO"
|Best Pop
|
|-
||2014
||"Je ti"
|Best Performer
|
|-
||2014
||"24 Ore (ft.Young Zerka)
|Best Pop
|
|-
|rowspan="2"|2016
|rowspan="2"|"Duart lart"
|Best Video / First Prize
|
|-
|Best Pop
|
|-
||2016
||"Kam nevojë (ft. Elinel)"
|Best Collaboration
|
|}

References 

Skënderaj, Alban